Andres dela Rosa Narvasa (November 30, 1928 – October 31, 2013) was the Chief Justice of the Supreme Court of the Philippines from December 1, 1991, to November 30, 1998.

He served as chairman of the Preparatory Commission for Constitutional Reform, a special agency tasked to look into potentially positive amendments to the Philippine Constitution, from 1999 to 2000.

Education
During his youth, Narvasa managed to excel in both academics and athletics. He was the captain of the University of Santo Tomas Intramural Basketball Team, as well as the top student of his class at the University of Santo Tomas Faculty of Civil Law.

Narvasa graduated elementary at Colegio de San Juan de Letran, 1938 (salutatorian), and secondary school at the Arellano High School, 1945 (valedictorian). He obtained his Bachelor of Laws, University of Santo Tomas in 1951 (magna cum laude), and received his Doctor of Laws (honoris causa), Pamantasan ng Lungsod ng Maynila on April 15, 1992, Doctor of Laws (honoris causa), University of Santo Tomas on November 21, 1992, and Doctor of Laws (honoris causa), Angeles University Foundation on April 1, 1993.

Narvasa graduated magna cum laude from the University of Santo Tomas Faculty of Civil Law, and placed second in the 1951 Philippine Bar Examinations, with a bar rating of 91.6%

Career
Narvasa taught at the University of Santo Tomas Faculty of Civil Law. Soon, he became a full professor of law, and eventually Dean of the University of Santo Tomas Faculty of Civil Law|Faculty of Civil Law. 
 
Narvasa started as Law Practitioner in 1952, as head, Andres R. Narvasa & Associates. He then became professor of law, 1952, bar reviewer, 1959, legal counsel, University of Santo Tomas, 1973, dean, Faculty of Civil Law, University of Santo Tomas, 1967–1973, vice-rector for student affairs, University of Santo Tomas, 1969–1972, member of the board of trustees, University of Santo Tomas, 1974 and president of the Faculty Club, University of Santo Tomas, 1969.

Narvasa was appointed as the general counsel for the Agrava Fact-finding Commission, formed by then President Ferdinand Marcos and tasked to investigate the death of former senator and staunch Marcos critic Benigno Aquino Jr. The commission was chaired by former Philippine Court of Appeals Associate Justice Corazon Juliano-Agrava. As general counsel, Narvasa meticulously pieced together evidence to point out the military in the Aquino-Galman murders.

President Corazon Aquino appointed Narvasa as associate justice of the Philippine Supreme Court on April 10, 1986. Narvasa served as associate justice until his appointment as chief justice on December 1, 1991, also by President Aquino.

Narvasa administered the oath of office during the inaugurations of Philippine presidents Fidel V. Ramos and Joseph Ejercito Estrada.

After his retirement in 1998, he was appointed by then President Joseph Ejercito Estrada to serve as chairman of the Preparatory Commission for Constitutional Reform, an independent commission formed to study the basic charter and suggest potentially positive modifications. He served in this capacity from 1999 to 2000.

In November 2000, Narvasa became counsel for President Joseph Ejercito Estrada in his impeachment proceedings before the Philippine Senate.

Closure of the Ninoy Aquino's murder case
On the 24th anniversary of the death of Benigno Aquino Jr., Narvasa, 78, pleaded that Filipinos should close the book on the assassination of Aquino and that the 14 soldiers incarcerated should now be freed – “they have suffered enough;‘It’s finished. Since retiring, he plays golf twice a week, and enjoys being with his 15 grandchildren. He presently gives legal advice to ousted President Joseph Estrada. Narvasa considers the Ninoy murder still a mystery.

Private life
Married to Janina Yuseco, Narvasa has six children: Andres, Jr., Raymundo, Gregorio II, Socorro, Martin, and Regina. Narvasa's son, Andres, Jr., was Commissioner of the Philippine Basketball Association. Another son, Gregorio II, served as commissioner for both Philippine Basketball League and the Metropolitan Basketball Association, but now concentrates on practicing law. Narvasa and son, Gregorio, run the Fortun Narvasa & Salazar Law Office in partnership with Sigfrid A. Fortun and Roderick R.C. Salazar III.

Awards
Narvasa received the following awards:

 Award of Distinction, University of Santo Tomas, February 28. 1972
 Award for Outstanding Achievements in Legal Education, Faculty of Civil Law, University of Santo Tomas, September 2, 1981
 Appreciation Certificate, UST College of Nursing, 1970
 Certificate of Appreciation and Recognition, 1st Summer Seminar on Educational Management, University of Santo Tomas, May 1972
 Appreciation Certificate, Faculty of Medicine and Surgery, University of Santo Tomas, August 11, 1973,  Plaque of Appreciation, Faculty Association of UST, October 18, 1978
 Award for Meritorious Service, Faculty of Civil Law, September 2, 1981 & September 4, 1982
 Plaque of Appreciation, 1953 Law Class of UST, March 26, 1983
 Award as Most Outstanding Honor Graduate for 1983–1984 for exemplary public service, July 28, 1984
 Plaque of Merit as Most Outstanding Alumnus of Faculty of Civil Law, UST Alumni Foundation, Inc., September 1, 1984
 Papal Award Pro Ecclesia et Pontifice, May 1977
 Human Rights Award, Concerned Women of the Philippines, December 9, 1984
 Ninoy Aquino Movement for Freedom, Justice, Peace and Democracy of the United States of America, August 1985
 Knight Grand Cross of Rizal, June 19, 1992
 Outstanding Manilan ’93, 422nd Araw ng Maynila Executive Committee, June 24, 1993

See also
 Andres Narvasa, Supreme Court of the Philippines Eulogies

References

Sources
Cruz, Isagani A. (2000). Res Gestae: A Brief History of the Supreme Court. Rex Book Store, Manila

Chief justices of the Supreme Court of the Philippines
20th-century Filipino judges
People from Manila
Colegio de San Juan de Letran alumni
University of Santo Tomas alumni
1928 births
2013 deaths
Associate Justices of the Supreme Court of the Philippines